George Carlos Babcock (21 June 1876 - 28 October 1921) was an American racecar driver. He was also involved in the early days of aviation as a test pilot, as well as spending time as a test driver.

Biography
He was born on 21 June 1876 in Hartford, Connecticut. He participated in the 1915 Indianapolis 500. He died after a short illness in St. Francis' Hospital in Hartford, Connecticut on 28 October 1921.

Indy 500 results

References

1876 births
1921 deaths
Indianapolis 500 drivers
Sportspeople from Hartford, Connecticut
Racing drivers from Connecticut